Mariya Ivanovna Dolina (18 December 1922 – 3 March 2010) was a Pe-2 pilot and deputy squadron commander in the women's 125th “Marina M. Raskova” Borisov Guards Bomber Regiment. She was active primarily on the 1st Baltic Front during World War II. On 18 August 1945 she was awarded the title Hero of the Soviet Union.

Early life
Born in the village of Sharovka (present-day Poltavsky District, Omsk Oblast in Siberia), Dolina was the eldest daughter of Ukrainian peasants. She had nine siblings.

In 1934, after Mariya's father lost his leg in the Russian Civil War, the family moved back to Ukraine again. Because of her father's condition, Dolina had to provide for the whole family, consequently she left school and went to work in a factory. Despite her mother's opposition, Mariya trained at a flying club of the paramilitary Osoaviakhim and, in 1940, graduated from the Kherson Flying School, after which she entered the Engels Military Flying School. Before the German invasion of 22 June 1941, she worked as an instructor in flying clubs in Dnipropetrovsk and Mykolaiv.

World War II 
In July 1941, she started her military service. She initially flew the Polikarpov Po-2, liaising with infantry units. Later she became a crew member of a Petlyakov Pe-2 twin-engine, medium-range bomber, in the 587th Dive Bomber Regiment.

Dolina, who admitted to being restless, nevertheless became a deputy squadron commander in her unit, which was later re-designated as the 125th “M.M. Raskova” Borisov Guards Dive Bomber Regiment.

On 2 June 1943, Dolina's aircraft was hit by enemy anti-aircraft artillery over Kuban prior to reaching her target, disabling an engine and causing a fire. Dolina's fighter escort had disappeared while pursuing enemy fighters, yet she continued flying and made the scheduled bomb-drop. On the way back, with no fighter escort, her flight was attacked by six German fighters (two Fw 190s and four Bf 109s). Dolina's tail gunner shot down one Fw 190 and one Bf 109. Altogether, Mariya flew seventy-two missions bombing enemy ammunition depots, strongholds, tanks, artillery batteries, rail and water transports, and supporting Soviet ground troops.

Postwar life 
After the war, Dolina continued to serve in the Soviet Air Force as deputy squadron commander of a bomber aviation regiment. She lived in the city of Šiauliai (now Lithuania) and then in Riga (now Latvia) where she worked in the Latvian Communist Party Central Committee until 1975. She was married twice, both times to former Soviet Air Forces mechanics. After her first husband died in 1972, she married another from her former regiment.

On the 50th Anniversary of the end of World War II, Dolina was promoted to the rank of major by Ukrainian President Leonid Kuchma. Many other secondary schools and pioneer detachments were named after her.

Dolina lived in Kiev from 1983 until her death on 3 March 2010 at the age of 87 and participated in the 2009 celebrations of Victory Day.

Awards and honors
 Hero of the Soviet Union (18 August 1945)
 Order of Lenin (18 August 1945)
 Two Orders of the Red Banner (1 July 1943 and 1 July 1944)
 Order of the Patriotic War 1st class (11 March 1985)
 campaign and service medals
 Order of Bohdan Khmelnytsky (14 October 1999)
 Honorary Citizen of Kiev (2003)

See also

 List of female Heroes of the Soviet Union
 125th Guards Dive Bomber Regiment
 Petlyakov Pe-2

References

Bibliography
 
 
 

 *

External links
GUARDS MAJOR MARIYA DOLINA by Henry Sakaida, soviet-awards.com (2002)
Mariya Ivanovna Dolina in the "Country Heroes" portal.
Dolina's award certificates 

1922 births
2010 deaths
Soviet Air Force officers
Heroes of the Soviet Union
Night Witches aviators
Women air force personnel of the Soviet Union
Ukrainian women in World War II
Soviet women in World War II
Ukrainian aviators
Recipients of the Order of the Red Banner
Recipients of the Medal "For Courage" (Russia)
People from Omsk Oblast
Russian women aviators